Henry Robinson (13 November 1863 – date of death unknown) was an English cricketer. Robinson's batting style is unknown. He was born at Nottingham, Nottinghamshire.

Robinson made a single first-class appearance for Nottinghamshire against the Marylebone Cricket Club at Lord's in 1889. In a match which the Marylebone Cricket Club won by 7 wickets, he was dismissed in both Nottinghamshire's first and second-innings for duck's by Dick Pougher.

References

External links
Henry Robinson at ESPNcricinfo
Henry Robinson at CricketArchive

1863 births
Cricketers from Nottingham
English cricketers
Nottinghamshire cricketers
Year of death missing